The Battle of Lannoy took place on 29 December 1566 between an army of Geuzen and a Spanish force. It was one of the first battles of the Dutch Revolt.

Battle 
Two days after another Geuzen army, under Jan Denys, had been defeated at Wattrelos by Maximilian Vilain, Philip of Niorcarmes, stadtholder of Hainaut, attacked a large force of Calvinists under Pierre Cornaille at Lannoy. Both Denys and Cornaille had been moving to lift the Siege of Valenciennes.

Noircarmes fell on the Protestants and broke their formation in the first attack, after which the rest tried to flee. More than half were killed or chased into the nearby river. According to Catholics 2600 died, however, La Barre recounted only “700 to 800 Huguenots” fallen. Still, this defeat was a heavy one for the South-Dutch rebels, many times heavier than Wattrelos.

A few days later Doornik was conquered by the Spanish and on 24 March 1567 Valenciennes surrendered to the Spanish, after a third relief attempt had been defeated at Oosterweel.

References 

Lannoy
Battles in Hauts-de-France